Teachers is an American sitcom television series that aired on NBC. The show ran for six episodes from March 28 until its cancellation on May 2, 2006. Loosely based upon a 2001 UK series of the same name, it was developed by Matt Tarses, co-executive producer of the medical comedy Scrubs.

Overview
Set in New Jersey, Teachers stars Justin Bartha as Jeff Cahill, a skilled, irreverent young English teacher at the fictitious Filmore High School, whose apparent apathy toward his job masks his actual wisdom concerning teaching at an underfunded school. Sarah Alexander co-stars as idealistic British history teacher Alice Fletcher, his only kindred spirit on the faculty, for whom Jeff also has romantic feelings. Alice does not reciprocate these feelings, but she is becoming fonder of him. Radio personality Phil Hendrie plays Dick Green, an apathetic phys-ed and physics teacher, who spends his afternoons  behind the gym. Deon Richmond plays Calvin Babbitt, the drama teacher whose attitude about teaching falls somewhere between Jeff's and Alice's.  He often gets caught up in Jeff's schemes. Kali Rocha stars as the uncaring, rule-abiding Principal Emma Wiggins. Matt Winston stars as Mitch Lenk, a math teacher and lap dog to Principal Wiggins. It is implied that he is romantically interested in her. Sarah Shahi stars as Tina Torres, an attractive teacher from Mexico. She is Alice's possible rival for Jeff's affections, though it seems Jeff prefers Alice. It is revealed in Episode 05 ("Testing 1-2-3") that she does not have her teaching license, having gone to school, but taking jobs before she took her finals. However, she stated later in the episode that she will be taking them.

Cast
Justin Bartha as Jeff Cahill
Sarah Alexander as Alice Fletcher
Phil Hendrie as Dick Green
Deon Richmond as Calvin Babbitt
Kali Rocha as Emma Wiggins
Sarah Shahi as Tina Torres
Matt Winston as Mitch Lenk

Production
Like many American sitcoms, Teachers was shot before a studio audience.

The series began development under the title Filmore Middle, which reflected its original middle school setting.

Though adapted for American television by Matt Tarses, a writer and producer of the critically lauded series Sports Night and Scrubs, Teachers was panned by many critics (including the San Francisco Chronicle'''s Tim Goodman) as unoriginal and clichéd. The show was quickly cancelled by NBC, the news coming on May 15.

Episodes

Ratings
Based on average total viewers per episode of Teachers on NBC:

See also
 Teachers (UK TV series)''

References

External links
 

2000s American high school television series
2000s American sitcoms
2000s American workplace comedy television series
2006 American television series debuts
2006 American television series endings
American television series based on British television series
English-language television shows
NBC original programming
Television series about educators
Television series by Universal Television
Television shows set in New Jersey